Ronald J. Diamond (born July 30, 1958) is an American film producer from Los Angeles, CA. He is the founder of Acme Filmworks, the Animation Show of Shows and the co-founder of Animation World Network.

Diamond has lectured at animation schools, served as a juror and a guest speaker at film festivals. He has been a member of the Academy of Motion Picture Arts and Sciences, Shorts Films and Feature Animation branch since 2002, and is a collaborator with the LA Opera creative team.

Diamond has contributed to the restoration and preservation efforts of films that are in the permanent collections of the Academy of Motion Picture Arts and Sciences, Academy Film Archive, UCLA Film and Television Archive and Library of Congress.

Early life and education 
Diamond was born in Covina, California and was raised in Ontario, California. He studied at the University of California, Los Angeles, where he earned Bachelor of Arts and Master of Fine Arts degrees.

Career 
Ron Diamond has had two primary producing, distributing and curating careers in live-action film making (1980–1990), and in animation film production (1990–present). Diamond spent nine years producing live action films including The Chocolate War and The Dark Backward before refocusing his career towards animation.

Animation Show of Shows 
In the 1980s, Diamond produced and post-produced numerous compilations of short films for festivals such as: the International Tournées of Animation, The Animation Celebration. The Outrageous Animation Show, The Computer Animation Show, Streams of Consciousness: New American Animation, Liquid Television, The Oscar Showcase Tour, and Will Vinton's Festival of Claymation.

In 1998, Diamond founded the Animation Show of Shows (ASOS), a 501(c)(3) non-profit. He recognized an absence of animated short films in the theatrical circuit, "so he set out to curate a collection of new, significant, artistic, narrative and experimental animated shorts from those he had seen during the past year at major animation festivals."

Diamond has presented ASOS and his annual Oscar Showcase Tour to students and industry professionals alike at venues such as Harvard University, DreamWorks, Pixar, and the Walt Disney Family Museum. As of 2020, 41 films featured in the ASOS have gone on to receive Academy Award Nominations with 11 Oscar wins.

Acme Filmworks 

Diamond founded the commercial animation company Acme Filmworks in 1990. It has produced animated commercials for companies including: Levi's Jeans for Women, United Airlines, AT&T, Microsoft, Charmin, Ad Council and the Alzheimer's Association. Acme Filmworks has produced logos and main title sequences including: the Scott Free Productions logo, Universal Pictures' Robin Hood, Disney's The Wonderful Ice Cream Suit, The Path, and Ken Follet's Pillars of The Earth.

Through Acme, Diamond produced the Academy Award-nominated short film Nibbles, and the animated feature film for PBS' American Playhouse Drawn From Memory. He was also the executive producer of Drew Carey's Green Screen Show and has produced segments for the following Simpsons episodes: The Incredible Lightness of Being a Baby, Orange Is the New Yellow, What to Expect When Bart's Expecting.

As an executive producer through Acme, Diamond has been nominated for a BAFTA, an Emmy, and an Academy Award. He has won awards including a Clio and an Annie Award, and has earned Annecy honors.

Animation World Network 
In 1995 Diamond partnered with Dan Sarto and founded the Animation World Network. AWN is an online magazine that covers animator profiles, film distribution, animation studio activities, licensing, CGI and other animation technologies, as well as current events in all fields of animation.

A year after Toy Story debuted, Sarto and Diamond produced their first issue.

Film restoration 
Diamond has contributed to film restoration and preservation through Acme Filmworks and the Animation Show of Shows. Most of the films he's restored are at the Academy of Motion Picture Arts and Sciences, Academy Film Archive, and the UCLA Film and Television Archive. The entire Acme Filmworks digital archive is at the Library of Congress.

Credits

Publications 

Diamond, Ronald (2007-2013). The Animation Show of Shows 9 DVD Boxed Sets, Volumes 1-54. Hollywood, CA: Acme Filmworks, Inc.
Diamond, Ronald (2016-2019). The Annual Animation Show of Shows DVD compilations, Volumes 17- 20. Los Angeles, CA: Animation Show of Shows, Inc.

References

External links 

 
 

1958 births
Living people
Animators from California
American film producers
American animated film producers
Annie Award winners
People from Los Angeles